Isaac Williamson Scudder (1816 – September 10, 1881) was a U.S. Representative from New Jersey for one term from 1873 to 1875.

Early life and education
Born in Elizabethtown (now Elizabeth, New Jersey), Scudder completed preparatory studies.
He studied law, was admitted to the bar in 1838 and commenced practice in Elizabeth, New Jersey.

Career
He moved to Jersey City. He was prosecutor of the pleas of Hudson County from 1845–1855, and was appointed as a member of the first police commission of Jersey City, in 1866.

Scudder was elected director and counsel of the New Jersey Railroad and Transportation Co. May 14, 1866, and director of the United New Jersey Railroad and Canal Company on May 21, 1872.

Congress
Scudder was elected as a Republican to the Forty-third Congress (March 4, 1873 – March 3, 1875).
He was not a candidate for reelection in 1874.
He was appointed solicitor of the Pennsylvania Railroad for Hudson County, New Jersey, June 23, 1875.

Death
He died in Jersey City September 10, 1881.
He was interred in St. John's Episcopal Churchyard, Elizabeth, New Jersey.

References

Isaac Williamson Scudder at The Political Graveyard

1816 births
1881 deaths
Politicians from Elizabeth, New Jersey
Burials in New Jersey
Republican Party members of the United States House of Representatives from New Jersey
Politicians from Jersey City, New Jersey
19th-century American politicians